Fernand Besnier (27 March 1894 – 7 February 1977) was a French racing cyclist. He finished in last place in the 1925 Tour de France.

References

External links

1894 births
1977 deaths
French male cyclists
Place of birth missing